Rage and Time: A Psychopolitical Investigation is a 2006 book by the German philosopher Peter Sloterdijk. It traces the role and prevalence of rage in Western history, starting with the Thumos described by Homer in the Iliad. Sloterdijk argues that a productive form of rage has been suppressed by first Christianity and then psychoanalysis.

An English translation by Mario Wenning was published in 2010.

Contents
 Rage transactions
 The wrathful god: the discovery of the metaphysical revenge bank
 The rage revolution: on the communist world bank of rage
 The dispersion of rage in the era of the center
 Conclusion: beyond resentment

Reception
Julia Encke of the Frankfurter Allgemeine Zeitung gave Sloterdijk the label of a "democratically thinking Nietzsche reader" due to his search for a rage free from ressentiment, and wrote that the book was "a first step" toward such a thing. Publishers Weekly called the book "a brilliant and conceptually rich analysis of the influence of rage on the development of Western culture". The critic continued: "Though frequently hampered by excessive academic jargon and a theoretically questionable oscillation between the non-equivalent notions of Thymos and rage, the book offers a fascinating account of the historical dynamics of social development".

The French translation of the book received the Prix européen de l'essai Charles Veillon in 2008.

References

External links
 American publicity page
 German publicity page 

2006 non-fiction books
Books by Peter Sloterdijk
Contemporary philosophical literature
German non-fiction books
German-language books
Rage (emotion)
Suhrkamp Verlag books